Penthostola albomaculatis is a moth of the family Tortricidae. It is found in Thailand and southern China.

References

Moths described in 1985
Olethreutini